Close Up is the second and final studio album by English punk band the Outsiders, which would later evolve into the Sound. It was released in 1978 by record label Raw Edge.

Background 
In the liner notes of the 2012 reissue of the album, the musical style of Close Up was described: "Gone were the acoustic guitars and lengthy solos, replaced by urgency, stabbing riffs and a full-on, hard-edged punk/new wave sound".

Track listing 
 Side A

 "Vital Hours"
 "Observations"
 "Fixed Up"
 "Touch and Go"
 "White Debt"
 "Count for Something"

 Side B

 "Out of Place"
 "Keep the Pain Inside"
 "Face to Face"
 "Semi-Detached Life"
 "Conspiracy of War"

Critical reception 

Close Up received a lukewarm response from critics, who were more enthusiastically about it than the band's previous album, Calling on Youth. NME reviewer John Hamblett assessed the album as "patchy, but promising", calling the Outsiders "a band with a future". Tony Parsons, on the other hand, reviewing for the same magazine, described it as "tuneless, gormless, gutless".

Personnel 
 Adrian Borland – vocals, guitar
 Jan (Adrian Janes) – drums, vocals
 Bob Lawrence – bass guitar
 Graham Green – bass guitar

 Technical
 Gary Lucas – engineering
 June Oliver – sleeve photography

References

External links
 Liner notes for the 2012 reissue of the album
 

1978 albums
The Outsiders (British band) albums